Mike or Michael Potts may refer to:
 Michael Potts (actor), American actor
 Michael Potts (footballer) (born 1991), English footballer
 Mike Potts (baseball) (born 1970), former left-handed Major League Baseball relief pitcher
 Mike Potts (American football) (born 1985), American football quarterback
 Michael Potts (diplomat), Australian diplomat